Blandfield is a historic plantation house located at Caret, Essex County, Virginia. It was built about 1716–1720, and is a brick dwelling consisting of a two-story, central block with flanking two-story dependencies connected by one-story hyphens in the Georgian style. Blandfield was built for William Beverley (1696–1756), son of Virginia's first native-born historian, Robert Beverley, Jr. (c. 1673–1722). The house is one of the largest colonial plantation mansions in Virginia, and as of 1969, was still in the Beverley family.

It was listed on the National Register of Historic Places in 1969.

References

External links
 
 Blandfield, U.S. Route 17 & State Route 624, Caret, Essex County, VA: 109 photos, 21 measured drawings, and 6 photo caption pages at Historic American Buildings Survey
 Blandfield, Smokehouse, Caret, Essex County, VA: 3 photos and 1 photo caption page at Historic American Buildings Survey

Beverley family of Virginia
Bland family of Virginia
Colonial architecture in Virginia
Georgian architecture in Virginia
Historic American Buildings Survey in Virginia
Houses completed in 1750
Houses in Essex County, Virginia
Houses on the National Register of Historic Places in Virginia
National Register of Historic Places in Essex County, Virginia
Plantation houses in Virginia